Events in 1973 in Japanese television.

Debuts

Ongoing shows
Music Fair, music (1964-present)
Mito Kōmon, jidaigeki (1969-2011)
Sazae-san, anime (1969-present)
Ōedo Sōsamō, jidaigeki (1970-1984)
Ōoka Echizen, jidaigeki (1970-1999)
Sasuga no Sarutobi, anime (1972-1974)
Star Tanjō!, talent (1971-1983)
Dokonjō Gaeru, anime (1972–1974)
Mazinger Z, anime (1972–1974)
Science Ninja Team Gatchaman, anime (1972–1974)

Endings

See also
1973 in anime
1973 in Japan
List of Japanese films of 1973

References